The 2022–23 Boston Pride season is the eighth ice hockey season in Boston Pride franchise history. A charter team of the Premier Hockey Federation (PHF), the 2022–23 season also marks the team's eighth season in the league. The two-time defending Isobel Cup champions, the franchise will attempt to become the first to capture three Cup championships in a row.

Regular season

News and notes
 November 5: Élizabeth Giguère scored the first goal of the season and Loren Gabel recorded the first multi-goal game of the season.
 November 18: Rookie goaltender Corinne Schroeder set a new league record for consecutive shutouts, recording three shutouts across the first three games of the season.
 December 11, 2022: Corinne Schroeder stopped all 25 shots to set a new PHF single season record with her fourth shutout in just seven starts for the first place Pride. 
 December 12, 2022: Jillian Dempsey tied a PHF record with six points on Sunday including her first career hat-trick to lead Boston in a 7-5 win versus Buffalo.

Standings

Schedule

|- style="background:#cfc;"
| 1 || November 5 || Connecticut Whale || 4–0 ||  || Schroeder ||  Warrior Ice Arena || 1–0–0 || 3 || 
|- style="background:#cfc;"
| 2 || November 6 || Metropolitan Riveters || 2–0 ||  || Schroeder || Warrior Ice Arena || 2–0–0 || 6 || 
|- style="background:#cfc;"
| 3 || November 18 || @ Minnesota Whitecaps || 2–0 ||  || Schroeder || Richfield Ice Arena || 3–0–0 || 9 || 
|- style="background:#ccf;"
| 4 || November 19 || @ Minnesota Whitecaps || 5–4 || OT || Schroeder || Richfield Ice Arena || 4–0–0 || 11 || 
|- style="background:#ccf;"
| 5 || November 26 || Toronto Six || 3–2 || OT || Schroeder || Warrior Ice Arena || 5–0–0 || 13 || 
|- style="background:#fcc;"
| 6 || November 27 || Toronto Six || 3–7 ||  || Schroeder || Warrior Ice Arena || 5–1–0 || 13 || 

|- style="background:#cfc;"
| 7 || December 10 || @ Buffalo Beauts || 3–0 ||  || Schroeder || Northtown Center || 6–1–0 || 16 || 
|- style="background:#cfc;"
| 8 || December 11 || @ Buffalo Beauts || 7–5 ||  || Schroeder || Northtown Center || 7–1–0 || 19 || 
|- style="background:#fcc;"
| 9 || December 18 || @ Connecticut Whale || 4–6 ||  || Schroeder || International Skating Center of CT || 7–2–0 || 19 || 

|- style="background:#cfc;"
| 10 || January 6 || @ Connecticut Whale || 5–2 ||  || Schroeder || International Skating Center of CT || 8–2–0 || 22 || 
|- style="background:#cfc;"
| 11 || January 7 || @ Metropolitan Riveters || 4–1 ||  || Schroeder || The Rink at American Dream || 9–2–0 || 25 || 
|- style="background:#cfc;"
| 12 || January 14 || Buffalo Beauts || 8–0 ||  || Schroeder || Warrior Ice Arena || 10–2–0 || 28 || 
|- style="background:#ccf;"
| 13 || January 15 || Buffalo Beauts || 2–1 || OT || Schroeder || Warrior Ice Arena || 11–2–0 || 30 || 
|- style="background:#cfc;"
| 14 || January 21 || @ Montreal Force || 5–0 ||  || Schroeder || Centre Premier Tech || 12–2–0 || 33 || 
|- style="background:#fff;"
| 15 || January 22 || @ Montreal Force || 1–2 || OT || Schroeder || Centre Premier Tech || 12–2–1 || 34 || 

|- style="background:#cfc;"
| 16 || February 4 || Metropolitan Riveters || 5–0 ||  || Schroeder || Warrior Ice Arena || 13–2–1 || 37 || 
|- style="background:#cfc;"
| 17 || February 5 || Connecticut Whale || 5–2 ||  || Schroeder || Warrior Ice Arena || 14–2–1 || 40 || 
|- style="background:#cfc;"
| 18 || February 18 || Montreal Force || 4–1 ||  || Schroeder || Warrior Ice Arena || 15–2–1 || 43 || 
|- style="background:#cfc;"
| 19 || February 19 || Montreal Force || 2–1 ||  || Schroeder || Warrior Ice Arena || 16–2–1 || 46 || 
|- style="background:#;"
| 20 || February 24 || @ Metropolitan Riveters ||  ||  ||  || The Rink at American Dream ||  ||  || 

|- style="background:#;"
| 21 || March 3 || Minnesota Whitecaps ||  ||  ||  || Warrior Ice Arena ||  ||  ||
|- style="background:#;"
| 22 || March 4 || Minnesota Whitecaps ||  ||  ||  || Warrior Ice Arena ||  ||  ||
|- style="background:#;"
| 23 || March 10 || @ Toronto Six ||  ||  ||  || Canlan Ice Sports – York ||  ||  || 
|- style="background:#;"
| 24 || March 11 || @ Toronto Six ||  ||  ||  || Canlan Ice Sports – York ||  ||  || 

|- style="text-align:center;"
|

Roster

2022–23 roster 

Coaching staff and team personnel
 Head coach: Paul Mara
 Assistant coach: Marissa Gedman
 Athletic trainer: Jerry Foster

Statistics
.

Skaters

Goaltenders

Awards and honors

Player of the Week
Corinne Schroeder: Three Stars of the Week Award - First Star (Week of November 8, 2022)  
Elizabeth Giguere: Three Stars of the Week Award - Third Star (Week of November 8, 2022)
Corinne Schroeder: Three Stars of the Week Award  - Second Star (Week of November 22, 2022)

Transactions

Signings

References

Game recaps

Boston Pride
Boston Pride
Boston Pride
2022–23 PHF season
2022–23 PHF season by team